Hale Kesare is a small village in Mysore district of Karnataka state in India.

Location
Hale Kesare village is located immediately north of the ring road near R.S.Naidu Nagar satellite bus station, Mysore Towards Teachers Layout Nagunahalli Road

Education

 Flos Carmeli ICSE School.
 Government Primary School, Hale Kesare.
 Hale Kesare Anganvadi.

Post Office
There is a post office at Hale Kesare and the PIN code is 570003  It comes under Note Mudrana Nagar

Landmarks
Hale Kesare village has surrounded by Teachers Layout Mathrusree Layout Vittal Layout Adjacent villages Siddlingapura a big lake called KamanaKere. The end of the village is Kamana Kere Hundi and this point is marked by a square where bus No.150.AB turns back to the city bus station.  There is a primary school in this location.

Transportation
Hale Kesare village is about one kilometre north of the Ring Road circling Mysore city. It is two kilometres from R.S.Naidu satellite bus station.  Direct buses are also available from Mysore city bus station every half an hour (Bus No.150.AB). The nearest railway station is Mysore.

See also
 Mandi Mohalla
 St. Philomena's Cathedral, Mysore
 Hanumanthanagar
 Belagola
 Kesare
 Mysore North, Naidu Nagar

References

Mysore North
Suburbs of Mysore